The Slovakia men's national ice hockey team is the national ice hockey team of Slovakia and is controlled by the Slovak Ice Hockey Federation. A successor to the Czechoslovakia national team, it is one of the most successful national ice hockey teams in the world. The team's general manager is Miroslav Šatan and their head coach is Craig Ramsay.

Slovakia has won four medals at the World Championships, including a gold medal in 2002 in Sweden, and a bronze medal at the 2022 Winter Olympics.

History
The Slovak national team was formed following the breakup of Czechoslovakia, as the country was split into the Czech Republic and Slovakia. While the Czechs were allowed to compete in the highest pool (A), the IIHF ruled that because fewer players of the former Czechoslovak team were Slovaks, Slovakia would be required to start international play in pool C. However, Slovakia's play in the lower pools won it promotion to pool A by 1996. See also Post-Cold War period of the IIHF world championships.

Slovakia's first appearance in an elite ice hockey competition was at 1994 Winter Olympics in Lillehammer. With a lineup led by star Peter Šťastný, the Slovaks finished first in their group with three wins and two ties before losing to Russia in overtime in the quarterfinals. In the 1998 Winter Olympics in Nagano and the 2002 Winter Olympic Games in Salt Lake City, the Slovak team was unable to use its National Hockey League (NHL) players in the preliminary round due to a scheduling conflict. This affected all of the smaller countries, but devastated the Slovaks as most of their best players were from NHL teams. The NHL only shut down its schedule in time for the second group stage, and thus Slovakia failed to qualify among the final eight teams both times. This turn of events was troubling to the entire hockey community, and the rules were changed for the 2006 Winter Olympic Games in Turin, Italy.

Slovak national team members and notable players have included Hockey Hall of Fame inductee Marián Hossa, Marián Gáborík, Marcel Hossa; Miroslav Šatan; goaltender Jaroslav Halák and the tallest player in NHL history, Zdeno Chára. In the late 1990s, the St. Louis Blues placed Ľuboš Bartečko, Michal Handzuš, and Pavol Demitra on the same line. This trio became known as the "Slovak Pack," and were able to communicate in their native language without the opposition knowing what they were saying, unless, of course, they also understood Slovak.

Following the successful years for the Slovaks in the early 2000s at the World Championship, when they won the silver in St. Petersburg at the 2000 edition after a loss to the Czechs, winning the (so far) only title in Goteburg at the 2002 edition and securing bronze in Helsinki (2003), the results of Slovakia worsened and Slovakia began to drop out in the quarterfinals. The closest Slovakia came to relegation into Division I was in 2008, when they avoided relegation only thanks to two victories over Slovenia in the Relegation Round. Following was a series of three subsequent eliminations in the qualifying round (round of 12), including one at a 2011 edition Slovakia hosted in Bratislava and Košice for the first time, since the dissolution of Czechoslovakia.

Largely unexpected, however, was Slovakia's silver medal at the 2012 edition, again won in Helsinki. This was the first tournament after the introduction of the new two group format, followed by the quarterfinals. Due to the surprise this medal was after number of unsuccessful tournaments, it was by many regarded as with a value of a triumphal gold. In the following years however, Slovakia again failed to repeat medal successes and even failed to qualify to the quarterfinals, with the exception of 2013. 

In the Winter Olympic Games, Slovakia's highest achievement prior to 2022 was fourth place in Vancouver 2010. In the tournament they won against favourites Russia and Sweden, and lost against Canada in the semi-finals and against Finland in the bronze medal game. In 2022, the Slovaks claimed their first ever Olympic medal after defeating Sweden 4–0 in a bronze medal game.

Tournament record

Olympic Games

World Championship

Lower divisions

Top division

World Cup

At the 2016 edition, Slovakia was not represented. Instead 6 Slovak players were a part of Team Europe, which was led by Slovak general manager Miroslav Šatan.

Deutschland Cup
 Gold medal (1997, 2006, 2011, 2016)
 Silver medal (1994, 2001, 2017, 2021)
 Bronze medal (2000, 2004, 2005, 2012, 2014, 2018)

Team

Current roster
Roster for the 2022 IIHF World Championship.

Head coach: Craig Ramsay

2002 World Championship: Gold winning roster

2012 World Championship

2022 Winter Olympics

Player statistics
Source:  

Players in bold are still active.

Note: Pos = Position; GP = Games Played; G = Goals; GPG = Goal per game;

Head coaches
This table shows all Slovakia national team head coaches and their record at the IIHF World Championships, World Cup of Hockey and Winter Olympic Games (including qualifying tournaments). Data correct as of match played on 26 May 2022.

Source:

Team managers
Paul Loicq Award recipient Juraj Okoličány managed the team from 1993 to 1998.

Retired numbers
38 – Pavol Demitra A star of the national team and a victim of the 2011 Lokomotiv Yaroslavl plane crash – retired from the national team at the Slovak-hosted World Championship that year.

All-time record
The following table shows Slovakia's international record from 1940 to 1945 and since 1993, correct as of 8 February 2022 after a match against Germany. Teams in italics are no longer actively competing.

Source:

Overtime and penalty shots victories and losses are counted towards wins/losses.

Uniform evolution

See also
List of players in Slovakia men's national ice hockey team
Slovak Extraliga

References

External links

IIHF profile
National Teams of Ice Hockey

 
Ice hockey teams in Slovakia
National ice hockey teams in Europe